Bearreraig Waterfall is a waterfall of Scotland.

It is located on the Trotternish peninsula of the island of Skye, on the Bearreraig River which runs from Loch Leathan to Bearreraig Bay. The valley provides hydro-electric power from a 2.4 MW system.

See also
Waterfalls of Scotland

References

Landforms of the Isle of Skye
Waterfalls of Highland (council area)